Kamen Ariy (Russian: Камень Арий), or Ary Rock is a small islet of the Commander Islands in the North Pacific Ocean, east of the Kamchatka Peninsula in Eastern Russia. These islands belong to the Kamchatka Krai of the Russian Federation.

References 

Islands of the Commander Islands